Bryan Gregory (Gregory Beckerleg, February 20, 1951 – January 10, 2001) was an American rock musician, and founding member of and guitarist for The Cramps.

Biography
Gregory took the name Bryan after Brian Jones from The Rolling Stones, of whom he was a big fan. He met Cramps member Lux Interior when they worked together at a record store in NYC. He shared a birthday with fellow member Poison Ivy. In April 1976, Bryan took up second guitar, and was a distinctive sight in the early incarnation of The Cramps, along with his sister Pam Balaam (Pam Beckerleg) on drums. He was known for his oozing guitar sound, wild stage antics, and long black and white striped hair. He appeared on The Cramps' first two albums Gravest Hits and Songs the Lord Taught Us. He abruptly left the band in 1980, and was later replaced by Kid Congo Powers from the Gun Club. Due to his spooky on-stage persona, fans circulated rumours that he had left the band to practice Satanism.

After the Cramps, Gregory went on to play in Beast from 1980–1983. Bryan collaborated with producer Robyn Hunt – an Australian whom he married in Cleveland, Ohio – on March 6, 1984. Robyn and Bryan went onto create a horror TV show host called "Freezer" – with writer Char Rao, a former Cramps associate who played in the video. 

Bryan played a zombie in George Romero's Day of the Dead with fellow zombie fans Mike Metoff (Pagans guitarist and, at the time, temporary guitarist with The Cramps), and Char Rao in Pittsburgh.

Bryan, Pam, Robyn & child moved to Sarasota, Florida, whereupon Bryan and Robyn were divorced amicably.  However, his startling appearance was too much for the local Christian conservatives, and finding a job proved near impossible.  Eventually he landed a job managing an adult book store in Sarasota, Florida, where he settled for several years, joining his sister Pam Beckerleg in Osprey, Florida.

Gregory had a social reunion with Lux, Ivy & Nick backstage at a Cramps show in St. Petersburg, Florida in the early 1990s. Lux dedicated the last song of the night to Bryan.  Gregory moved to Los Angeles, forming The Dials from 1992–1995, and then joining Shiver with former musicians James Christ and Andrella (former band members of Beast and The Veil).

At the time of his death Gregory had been losing interest in his music goals. He reported he was feeling "exhausted and run down," according to his ex-wife Robyn (with whom he remained close friends), having put it down to working nights and taking care of a sick friend full-time.

Gregory drove himself to the emergency room for a check up at 4 a.m. Once there, he was transferred to another hospital – Anaheim Memorial Medical Center, Anaheim, California – where he died from heart failure at the age of 49.

His brother Rick Beckerleg, a Vietnam veteran and fireman from Detroit, Michigan, was by his side at his death. He was also close to his sister Pam Beckerleg, whom he referred to as "Little Wing" (a tattoo he wore in her honor).

Gregory was an avid science fiction and horror film fan, and especially fond of characters such as Frankenstein's monster. In addition to his love of music he also designed jewelry, did charcoal drawings, clothing art design, theater makeup and horror costume design in Cleveland, Ohio and Florida.

Gregory supported Native American causes and was reported by his mother (now deceased) to be a descendant of Civil War general William Sherman. Although his religious background was Catholic in his youth, he experimented in several religious cults and found them unsatisfactory.

Gregory's ashes are buried at Rose Hills Memorial Park in Whittier, California.

Legacy and influence
His noisy style of guitar playing was an inspiration to people like William Reid of The Jesus and Mary Chain, and Sonic Boom of Spacemen 3, as well as numerous other artists who would go on to make up the British shoegaze scene of the mid-to-late 1980s.

References

American punk rock guitarists
1951 births
2001 deaths
The Cramps members
20th-century American guitarists
Guitarists from Detroit
American male guitarists
Burials at Rose Hills Memorial Park
20th-century American male musicians